Rougemont is a municipality in the Canadian province of Quebec, located within the Rouville Regional County Municipality in the Montérégie region about 18 kilometers southwest of Saint-Hyacinthe. The population as of the Canada 2011 Census was 2,723.

While it is known for its apple orchards and sugar shacks, Rougemont is also the location of Mont Rougemont and Rougemont Airport.

Demographics

Population
Population trend:

(+) Amalgamation of the Parish of Saint-Michel-de-Rougemont and the Village of Rougemont on January 26, 2000.

Language
Mother tongue language (2006)

Education

The South Shore Protestant Regional School Board previously served the municipality.

See also
List of municipalities in Quebec
Municipal history of Quebec

References

External links

Official website - www.rougemont.ca
Rougemont and its Region
Tourisme Rougemont

Municipalities in Quebec
Incorporated places in Rouville Regional County Municipality